København, Kalundborg og - ? is a 1934 Danish film directed by Ludvig Brandstrup and Holger-Madsen. The film stars Ludvig Brandstrup and Ib Schønberg.

Many of the participating artists are popular Danish actors, but the cast also includes the Swedish actor Gösta Ekman, the American musician Louis Armstrong, the British music hall and vaudeville group Wilson, Keppel and Betty, and several dance orchestras.

Cast 
Ludvig Brandstrup as himself 
Ib Schønberg as Ludvigs friend and colleague
Gertrud Jensen as herself
Gösta Ekman as himself
Jon Iversen as a radiolistener
Maria Garland as the Consuls wife
Arthur Jensen as a hairdresser
Petrine Sonne as a radiolistener
Ejner Federspiel as the radio director
Aage Foss as a radiolistener
Lily Gyenes orchestra 
Louis Armstrong with orchestra
Teddy Brown 
Roy Foxs orchestra
Erik Tuxens orchestra
Jimmy Jade
Wilson, Keppel and Betty 
Rigmor Reumert 
Palle Reenberg 
Vera Lindstrøm 
Børge Munch Petersen 
Ellen Jansø 
Chr. Engelstoft

References

External links 

1934 films
1930s Danish-language films
Danish black-and-white films
Danish comedy films
1934 comedy films
Films directed by Holger-Madsen